Sharifabad (also Romanized as Sharīfābād and Sharafābād) is a village in Pachehlak-e Sharqi Rural District, in the Central District of Aligudarz County, Lorestan Province, Iran. At the 2006 census, its population was 65, in 15 families.

References 

Towns and villages in Aligudarz County